Robert Burdell (1 February 1939 – 15 May 2013) was an English rugby union and rugby league footballer. Born in Southport, Burdell began his career as a rugby union player with his hometown club Southport RFC before switching to rugby league in 1960. He went to play as a hooker for Liverpool City, St. Helens, Salford and Wigan, and also appeared for Lancashire at representative level.

Early life and rugby union career
Burdell was born on 1 February 1939 and grew up with his two brothers in Birkdale, Southport. He attended King George V Grammar School, where he was first introduced to rugby union. He went on to play for Southport RFC, becoming the youngest ever player to be picked for the first team.

Rugby league career
In the 1960s, Burdell switched codes to rugby league, and played for several clubs, including Liverpool City, St. Helens, Salford and Wigan.

Burdell played for Wigan in the 1970 Challenge Cup final, which Wigan lost 2–7 against Castleford.

Death
After falling ill earlier in the year, Burdell died on 15 May 2013 in Spain, aged 74.

References

External links
Saints Heritage Society profile

1939 births
2013 deaths
English rugby league players
English rugby union players
Liverpool City (rugby league) players
Rugby league hookers
Rugby league players from Southport
Rugby union players from Southport
St Helens R.F.C. players
Salford Red Devils players
Wigan Warriors players